Westminster Abbey by-election could refer to four by-elections held for the Parliament of the United Kingdom;

1921 Westminster Abbey by-election
1924 Westminster Abbey by-election
1932 Westminster Abbey by-election
1939 Westminster Abbey by-election